Edmund Flagg (1815–1890) was an American writer, lawyer, and diplomat.

Literary works
The Far West: or, A Tour Beyond the Mountains (1838)
Carrero, or, The Prime Minister, a Tale of Spain (1843)
Francis of Valois, or, The Curse of St. Valliar, a tale of the middle ages (1843)
The Howard Queen, a romance of history (1848)
Venice: The City of the Sea From the Invasion by Napoleon in 1797 to the Capitulation to Radetzky, in 1849 (1853)
Report on the Commercial Relations All of the United States Foreign With All Nations (1857)
Edmond Dantes: The Sequel to Alexander Dumas' Celebrated Novel The Count of Monte Cristo (1884)
Monte-Cristo's Daughter sequel to Alexander Dumas' great novel, the "Count of Monte-Cristo," and Conclusion of "Edmond Dantes" (1884)
De Molai: The Last of the Military Grand Masters of the Order of Knights Templar: A Romance of History (1888)

External links
 
 
 

1815 births
1890 deaths
American male novelists
19th-century American novelists
19th-century American male writers